Baron Rathcavan, of The Braid in the County of Antrim, is a title in the Peerage of the United Kingdom. It was created on 11 February 1953 for the Unionist politician Sir Hugh O'Neill, 1st Baronet. He had already been created a Baronet, of Cleggan  in the County of Antrim, on 17 June 1929. O'Neill was the third son of Edward O'Neill, 2nd Baron O'Neill (see the Baron O'Neill for earlier history of the family) and the uncle of the Prime Minister of Northern Ireland Terence O'Neill, Baron O'Neill of the Maine. Lord Rathcavan was also a male-line descendant of Edward Chichester, 1st Viscount Chichester (see the Marquess of Donegall). He was succeeded by his eldest surviving son, the second Baron. He succeeded his father as Unionist Member of Parliament for Antrim in 1952, a seat he held until 1959, and was later a member of the Parliament of Northern Ireland.  the titles are held by his son, the third Baron, who succeeded in 1994.

The Honourable Sir Con O'Neill, second son of the first Baron, was a diplomat. His daughter Baroness O'Neill of Bengarve is a philosopher.

The family seat is Cleggan Lodge, near Ballymena, County Antrim.

Barons Rathcavan (1953)
(Robert William) Hugh O'Neill, 1st Baron Rathcavan (1883–1982)
Phelim Robert Hugh O'Neill, 2nd Baron Rathcavan (1909–1994)
Hugh Detmar Torrens O'Neill, 3rd Baron Rathcavan (b. 1939)

The heir apparent and sole heir to the peerage is the present holder's son Hon. Francois Hugh Nial O'Neill (b. 1984).

Arms

See also
Baron O'Neill
Earl O'Neill
Baron O'Neill of the Maine
List of Northern Ireland Members of the House of Lords
Marquess of Donegall
O'Neill dynasty

Notes

References
Kidd, Charles & Williamson, David (editors). Debrett's Peerage and Baronetage (1990 edition). New York: St Martin's Press, 1990,

External links 
 Cleggan Lodge

Baronies in the Peerage of the United Kingdom
Noble titles created in 1953
Noble titles created for UK MPs
Chichester family